The men's single figure skating competition of the 2018 Winter Olympics was held on 16 and 17 February 2018 at the Gangneung Ice Arena in Gangneung, South Korea. The short program was held on 16 February and the free skating was held on 17 February.

This medal event was the 1000th medal event in the history of the Winter Olympic Games.

Summary 
With his victory at the 2018 Winter Olympics, Yuzuru Hanyu became the first male figure skater in 66 years to win two consecutive gold medals, after Dick Button did so in 1952. Fellow countryman Shoma Uno won the silver medal, and Spain's Javier Fernández won the bronze medal, Spain's first figure skating medal.

In the victory ceremony, the medals were presented by Tsunekazu Takeda, member of the International Olympic Committee, accompanied by Alexander Lakernik, ISU Figure Skating Vice President.

Vincent Zhou landed the first quadruple lutz at the Olympics. Nathan Chen became the first to ever land six quads, five clean. Chen also landed the first quadruple flip at the Olympics.

Qualification 

A total of 30 skaters qualified to compete for the event, with each country allowed to only enter a maximum of three. 24 quotas were handed out during the 2017 World Figure Skating Championships and the remaining six were given out at the 2017 CS Nebelhorn Trophy. Each country decided the entry of its teams, and athletes winning the quota were not necessarily granted the right to compete. All athletes competing must have met the minimum total elements score, which does not include component scores. For the short program this was 25.00 and the free skating 45.00.

Schedule 
All times are (UTC+9).

Results

Short program 
The short program was held on 16 February 2018.

Free skating 
The free skating was held on 17 February 2018.

Overall 
The skaters were ranked according to their overall score.

TP - Total points; SP - Short program; FS - Free skating

See also
 Yuzuru Hanyu Olympic seasons
 List of career achievements by Yuzuru Hanyu

References

Citations 

Men's
Men's events at the 2018 Winter Olympics
2018 in figure skating